Mulla Do-Piyaza (1527-1620) was the Advisor and Vizier of the Mughal emperor Akbar.Mulla Do-Piyaza, also portrayed as witty, was Birbal's rival. Even though these folk tales originated at the end of Akbar's reign (1556–1605), Mulla Do-Piyaza began to appear much later. Most scholars consider him to be completely fictional. Scholars believe him to be the son of loyal commander of Mughals Bairam khan, who was assassinated by Adham khan son of Maham Anga while on his way to Hajj. Later Mulla was adopted by Akbar as his courtier and even given dignity in Mughal court.

Background
In the folk tales, Mulla Do-Piyaza is depicted as Birbal's Muslim counterpart and as a proponent of orthodox Islam. Most of the time he is shown getting the better of both Birbal and Akbar, but there are other stories which portray him in a negative light.
 
No Mughal-era records mention any courtier called Mulla Do-Piyaza, and pamphlets on his life and jokes were published only in the late 19th century. One modern scholar, Hafiz Mahmood Shirani, states that Mulla Do-Piyaza was a historical personality whose original name was Abdul Momin, and who was born in India, left for Iran in 1582, returned after 36 years, died in 1620, and was buried in Handia. The manuscripts which mention him date back to an author who died in 1532—years before Akbar was born. According to C. M. Naim, Shirani's character is fictional and based on Persian folklore unrelated to Akbar.

See also
Dopiaza

References

Mughal Empire
Humour and wit characters of India
Akbar